Knattspyrnufélagið Víðir, commonly known as Víðir or Víðir Garði are an Icelandic sports club from Garður on the Reykjanes peninsula of Iceland. They were founded on 11 May 1936.

Basketball

Women's basketball
During the 1994-1995 season, Víðir women's basketball team, coached by Helga Eiríksdóttir, won in the second tier 1. deild kvenna after going lossless through the season.

Titles
1. deild kvenna
Winners: 1995

Football

Men's football
Víðir played in the Icelandic top-tier league from 1985-1987 and again in 1991, with 7th place being their best finish, in 1986. Víðir reached the final of the Icelandic Cup in 1987 at Laugardalsvöllur but lost against Fram.

Titles
Icelandic Cup
Runner-up: 1987

1. deild karla
Winners: 1990

2. deild karla
Winners: 1982, 1998

3. deild karla
Winners: 2007

References

External links 
Profile at Football Association of Iceland

Football clubs in Iceland
Association football clubs established in 1936
1936 establishments in Iceland